The Antitrust Law Journal is a triannual peer-reviewed academic journal published by the American Bar Association Section of Antitrust Law. The Executive_Editor is Tina Miller.

External links

American law journals
English-language journals
American Bar Association
Works about competition law
Triannual journals
Publications with year of establishment missing